Into the Homeland is a 1987 made for TV crime drama that aired on HBO on December 26, 1987, directed by Lesli Linka Glatter and starring Powers Boothe, C. Thomas Howell, Paul LeMat, Emily Longstreth and Cindy Pickett. The screenplay was written by Anna Hamilton Phelan.

In 1984, Jack Swallow (Boothe) is a Los Angeles Police Department detective who was unable to prevent a child's death during a drug raid. He leaves both the police force and his family to become a beach bum and surf shop owner of sorts in San Juan Capistrano. Three years later, his daughter turns up missing. He tracks her to her boyfriend (Howell) in rural Wyoming, whose father turns out to be the leader of a violent white power cult that kidnapped his daughter.

References

1987 television films
1987 films
1987 crime drama films
1980s English-language films
HBO Films films
American crime drama films
Crime television films
American drama television films
Films about cults
Films about the Los Angeles Police Department
Films directed by Lesli Linka Glatter
Films scored by David Mansfield
Films set in 1984
Films set in 1987
Films set in Los Angeles
Films set in Orange County, California
1980s American films